Burdin is a surname. Notable people with the surname include:

Claude Burdin (1788–1873), French engineer
Sergey Burdin (born 1970), Russian footballer